Aqjeh Bolagh may refer to:
 Aghcheh Bolagh
 Aqbolagh-e Sadat